Altusried is a municipality in the district of Oberallgäu in Bavaria in Germany. It is host to the open-air theatre Freilichtspiele Altusried.

References 

Oberallgäu